Darrang College, sometimes referred to at times as the Nalanda of the North Bank, is a college in Tezpur, Assam, India. It was started in July 1945 with 8 teachers and 112 students in the roll.It was permanently affiliated to Gauhati University in 1953. Darrang College offers bachelor's degrees in Arts, Commerce & Science from Gauhati University. Currently the college runs with 24 departments.

History

Late Kamakhya Prasad Tripathy, a veteran freedom fighter and trade union leader came forward to shoulder the responsibility of the founder principal. Initially, classes were held at the bungalow of Arnaldo Duchi, an Italian man who sold the property to the college.

Subsequently, the college was shifted for nearly two years to the American Base Hospital campus at Mission Chariali, then to the dak bungalow in the heart of the town, and finally to the present site in October 1951.

Darrang College has had an eventful career since its inception. The Dalai Lama of Tibet visited in 1959 after his historic flight from his own land, followed Smt. Indira Gandhi in 1963.

Ever since the college settled in its permanent site, it has been maintaining a high academic standard all through.

Late Padmanath Borgohain, a person who founded the Assam Sahitya Sabha and was the founder president of Darrang College

Academics
Darrang College offers the following courses:

 Two-year higher secondary courses in arts, science and commerce under Assam Higher Secondary Education Council.
 Three-year degree courses in arts, science and commerce under Gauhati University.
 Post graduation correspondence courses under P.G.C.S. of Gauhati University.
 B.C.A. under IDOL, Gauhati University.
 Degree, diploma and certificate courses under I.G.N.O.U.
 Certificate course in Conservation Ecology in association with W.W.F. of India.
 Post graduate courses in Botany, Zoology, Assamese and Geography is offered as regular course under Gauhati university

See also
List of accredited colleges in Assam

References

External links
http://www.darrangcollege.in/ Official website of Darrang College

Colleges in Assam
Colleges affiliated to Gauhati University
Educational institutions established in 1945
1945 establishments in India
Education in Tezpur